The Large Value Transfer System, or LVTS, was the primary system in Canada for electronic wire transfers of large sums of money, and was operated by Payments Canada. It permitted the participating institutions and their clients to send large sums of money securely in real-time with complete certainty that the payment will settle. The system was replaced in September 2021 by a new high-value payment system called Lynx.

Established in 1999, LVTS processed the majority of payments made every day in Canada, and was designed to work with funds in Canadian dollars (CAD). On a normal business day, it cleared and settled approximately CA$398 billion. Frequently, when settling the payments made through LVTS between each other, some banks found themselves with extra funds while others found themselves short; to come up with money, the banks were able borrow it from each other for a day, or "overnight". The rate at which they borrowed being called overnight rate, targets for which were set by the Bank of Canada as part of its monetary policy.

LVTS was a real-time payment system: the recipient of the payment received it irrevocably in near real-time. As it settled on a deferred net basis at the end of each day, it was not a real-time gross settlement system.

Participating institutions 
, there were 16 institutions, including the Bank of Canada, participating in LVTS:

ATB Financial
 Bank of America National Association
Bank of Canada
Bank of Montreal
BNP Paribas (Canada)
CIBC
Central 1 Credit Union (which represents BC and Ontario credit unions)
Desjardins Group (French: Fédération des caisses Desjardins du Quebec)
HSBC Bank Canada
ICICI Bank Canada
Laurentian Bank of Canada
National Bank of Canada
Royal Bank of Canada
Scotiabank
State Street Bank and Trust Company
Toronto-Dominion Bank

See also
Real Time Gross Settlement

References

External links 
Canadian Payments Association's LVTS Overview
A list of LVTS non-participant partners (usually smaller financial institutions)
 
Banking terms
Banking in Canada
Interbank networks